KAI Commuter Yogyakarta Line (also called KRL Yogya–Solo, informally KRL Jogja–Solo, KRL Solo–Jogja or KRL Joglo) is a commuter rail system in Indonesia serving Greater Yogyakarta in Special Region of Yogyakarta and Greater Surakarta (Solo) in Central Java. Operated by KAI Commuter, subsidiary of the national railway company Kereta Api Indonesia (KAI), it is the first electric-powered commuter rail system in Indonesia outside of Greater Jakarta's KRL Commuterline. The single-line system replaced Yogyakarta-Solo section of diesel-powered commuter rail Prambanan Ekspres (Prameks), also operated by KAI Commuter, on 10 February 2021.

History
Planning for an electric commuter rail system between Yogyakarta and Surakarta has been included in the 2030 National Railway Masterplan (Ripnas), compiled by Directorate General of Railways of Indonesian Ministry of Transportation since 2011. According to the masterplan, electrification of the line has entered feasibility study, so construction can be carried out immediately in the future after the study was finished. The limited operation of Prameks, its old-age rolling stock and high ridership is also in consideration. As of 2015, KAI has targeted on Prameks daily ridership of approximately 7,000 passengers per day. The replacement of diesel-powered Prameks with an electric-powered one is expected to increase commuters mobility and support tourism in Yogyakarta–Surakarta region.

In 2016, overhead catenary poles began to be stacked at Solo Jebres Station; since then the construction has stalled for about three years. The construction only continued starting early 2020, with the first poles being erected in Klaten Station.

Starting January 2021, the system underwent series of tests, and became fully operational starting on 10 February 2021. As a consequence, Prameks route will be shortened from previously Solo Balapan-Kutoarjo into Yogyakarta-Kutoarjo vice-versa. The system was officially launched by President Joko Widodo on 1 March 2021.

Operation
As of 2022, KAI Commuter Yogyakarta Line serves 13 stations across Greater Yogyakarta and Greater Surakarta, with terminus at Yogyakarta Station, Solo Balapan Station, and Palur Station. Some stations has rail and intermodal connection with Prambanan Ekspres, Batara Kresna railbus, Yogyakarta International Airport Rail Link and Adisumarmo Airport Rail Link, as well as bus rapid transit systems (Trans Jogja and Batik Solo Trans) and bus terminals (Tirtonadi Bus Terminal in Surakarta and Ir. Soekarno Bus Terminal in Klaten).

Passengers may purchase ticket using multiple trip card called Kartu Multi-Trip (KMT, "multitrip card"), bank-issued e-money cards (Mandiri e-Money, BRI BRIZZI, BNI TapCash, and BCA Flazz are accepted)  for a single-fare of Rp 8,000. KMT itself is priced at Rp 30,000 (including Rp 10,000 credit). Unlike its Greater Jakarta counterpart, the system does not offer single-trip card.

Stations

Rolling stock
KRL Commuterline Yogyakarta–Solo is using sets of EA202 (KRL i9000 KfW) series for its operation. EA202 series was formerly used on KRL Commuterline Pink Line, then was fully refurbished by INKA for Yogyakarta–Solo usage. Two 4-car sets of JR 205 series was operated to overcome the shortage of EA202 sets, some of which at the time of KRL launch was still refurbished by INKA. As it became redundant by September 2022, KAI Commuter decided to send back these sets to Jakarta region.

Women only cars (Kereta Khusus Wanita/KKW, in Indonesian) are not present in KRL Yogya-Solo. On further note, KKW was once introduced in Prameks (on ex-Holec and MCW DMU) but was later abolished.

See also
 Rail transport in Indonesia

References

Transport in the Special Region of Yogyakarta
Transport in Central Java
Railway lines in Indonesia
Regional rail in Indonesia
Rapid transit in Indonesia
Airport rail links in Indonesia
3 ft 6 in gauge railways in Indonesia
1500 V DC railway electrification